Selänne is a 2013 documentary film by Finnish director JP Siili about the Finnish professional ice hockey winger Teemu Selänne. The film covers both his professional and personal life.

References

External links
 

2013 films
2013 documentary films
2010s sports films
Finnish documentary films
Films directed by JP Siili
Documentary films about ice hockey